Bleggio Inferiore (Blec’ de Sota in local dialect) was a comune (municipality) in Trentino in the Italian region Trentino-Alto Adige/Südtirol. On January 1, 2010 it merged, with Lomaso, in the new municipality of Comano Terme.

Geography
The former municipality contained the frazioni (subdivisions, mainly villages and hamlets) Santa Croce, Duvredo, Vergonzo, Tignerone, Cillà, Villa, Sesto, Biè, Comighello, Bono, Cares, Ponte Arche (partly in Stenico, united with the urban area of Bleggio Inferiore), and Val d'Algone.

Bleggio Inferiore, located about 20 km west of Trento, bordered with the following municipalities: Ragoli, Giustino, Massimeno, San Lorenzo in Banale, Bocenago, Stenico, Dorsino, Lomaso, Tione di Trento, Bleggio Superiore, and Fiavè.

Demographic evolution
As of 31 December 2004, it had a population of 1,097 and an area of 26.2 km².

References

External links
 Homepage of the village
 Comano Terme official website
Coat of arms of Belggio Inferiore

Frazioni of Trentino
Former municipalities of Trentino